WILLOW (Willow Cricket, Willow Extra and Willow Canada) is an American pay television sports channel which is completely devoted to airing overseas cricket events, including live and recorded matches and other cricket-related programming in English, with the majority of its advertising targeted towards the Indian subcontinent diaspora in North America. The network is carried both as a traditional subscription-television channel which airs on pay-TV providers, and a paid streaming service available online.

The network was launched in the U.S. on August 27, 2010 and in Canada on May 14th, 2019. Broadcasts cricket matches and several cricket-based programs and coverage from around the world. The channel merged with NEO Cricket's American network in February 2013 as that provider drew down their American operations with the Willow name remaining. Times Internet, part of The Times Group, bought the service in 2016.

Willow has operated an Internet portal for live streaming of cricket events at www.willow.tv since 2003 for a monthly subscription fee. Willow has driven various innovations in the coverage of cricket, like video-based live scorecards and editorials. The website provides subscribers with video streams available on mobile apps and a streaming feed. A dedicated app for Willow was added for Apple TV on June 24, 2014. TV Everywhere access to the network's live feed on most devices was added for subscribers to pay-TV services, in time for IPL 11.

Willow has been the subject of complaints about its billing practices, including making it impossible to unsubscribe through the website or app, and ignoring repeated emails requesting cancellations.

Match rights
Willow holds the rights to some of the matches of the following teams and leagues:

National teams
Cricket Australia USA Only
Bangladesh Cricket Board USA / Canada
Pakistan Cricket Board USA / Canada
Cricket South Africa USA / Canada
Cricket West Indies USA Only
Sri Lanka Cricket USA Only
Zimbabwe Cricket USA / Canada
England and Wales Cricket Board USA Only

ICC Events
All ICC events from Nov 2015 to 2023 (Included in the new eight-year period are 18 ICC tournaments, including two ICC Cricket World Cups (2019 and 2023), one ICC Champions Trophy tournaments (2017) and three ICC World Twenty20 tournaments (2016 , 2021 and 2022) and one ICC World Test Championship tournaments (2021).

ICC Events 2015-2023

ICC major global events USA / Canada
2016 ICC World Twenty20 - India
2017 ICC Champions Trophy - England and Wales
2019 ICC Cricket World Cup - England and Wales
2021 ICC T20 World Cup - UAE
2022 ICC T20 World Cup - Australia 
2023 ICC Cricket World Cup - India
 
ICC qualifying events USA / Canada
2015 ICC World Twenty20 Qualifier - Ireland and Scotland
2018 ICC Cricket World Cup Qualifier - Zimbabwe
2019 ICC T20 World Cup Qualifier – United Arab Emirates
2023 ICC Cricket World Cup Qualifier - Zimbabwe
 
Other ICC events USA /Canada
2016 ICC Under-19 Cricket World Cup - Bangladesh
2017 ICC Women's Cricket World Cup - England and Wales
2018 ICC Under-19 Cricket World Cup - New Zealand
2018 ICC Women's World Twenty20 - West Indies
2020 ICC Under-19 Cricket World Cup - South Africa
2021 ICC Women's Cricket World Cup - New Zealand
2022 ICC Under-19 Cricket World Cup - West Indies
2022 ICC Women's T20 World Cup - South Africa

League and other competitions
Pakistan Super League USA / Canada
KFC T20 Big Bash League (Australia) USA Only
Indian Premier League (television/cable TV Everywhere rights only; ESPN+ holds all other streaming rights) USA / Canada
Caribbean Premier League USA Only
Lanka Premier League USA and Canada
Minor League Cricket USA

Former rights
India national cricket team (home match rights now owned by The Walt Disney Company and shown on its streaming services including ESPN+ and Hotstar)
New Zealand national cricket team (home match rights until 2013; home match rights now held by ESPN+)

References

External links
 Official website

Television channels and stations established in 2010
2010 establishments in the United States
English-language television stations in the United States
Sports television networks in the United States
Cricket in the United States
Cricket on television